The Men's 30 kilometre skiathlon competition at the FIS Nordic World Ski Championships 2023 was held on 24 February 2023.

Results
The race was started at 15:30.

References

Men's 30 kilometre skiathlon